Gürcüvən or Gyurdzhivan may refer to:
Gürcüvan, Azerbaijan
Gürcüvən, Shamakhi, Azerbaijan